Rolf Malcolm Njouongué-Fongué (born 25 November 1987) is a Swiss sprinter. He represented his country in the 60 metres at the 2010 World Indoor Championships getting disqualifying in the first round.

He has a Cameroonian father and a Swiss mother. His brothers are also sportsmen, the younger Eric is a basketball player while the older Thierry is a handballer.

International competitions

Personal bests

Outdoor
100 metres – 10.25 (+1.5 m/s, Bulle 2012)
200 metres – 21.42 (0.0 m/s, Bern 2012)
Indoor
60 metres – 6.65 (Magglingen 2013)
200 metres – 22.12 (Magglingen 2013)

References

1987 births
Living people
Swiss male sprinters
Swiss people of Cameroonian descent
Swiss sportspeople of African descent